Axinidris lignicola is a species of ant in the genus Axinidris. Described by Snelling in 2007, the species is known to be from South Africa, found in a dead tree trunk.

References

Axinidris
Hymenoptera of Africa
Insects described in 2007